Italian Americans in the Civil War are the Italian people and people of Italian descent, living in the United States, who served and fought in the American Civil War, mostly on the side of the Union. A contingent of soldiers from the former Kingdom of the Two Sicilies fought on the Confederate side, with most of these having been former prisoners of war who had fought against Giuseppe Garibaldi during his invasion of the Two Sicilies. Between 5,000 and 10,000 Italian Americans fought in the civil war.

In the Union army

Shortly after the onset of war, several hundred officers and soldiers in the Italian army went to the American legation at Turin and volunteered to fight in the Union army. Because of financial constraints, the U.S. army accepted only someof these volunteers."
  
Most of the Italian-Americans who joined the Union Army were recruited from New York City. Many Italians of note were interested in the war and joined the army, reaching positions of authority. Brigadier General Edward Ferrero was the original commander of the 51st New York Regiment. He commanded both brigades and divisions in the eastern and western theaters of war and later commanded a division of the United States Colored Troops. Colonel Enrico Fardella, of the same and later of the 85th New York regiment, was made a brevet brigadier general when the war ended.

Francis B. Spinola recruited four regiments in New York, was soon appointed Brigadier General by President Abraham Lincoln and given command of the Spinola Brigade. Later he commanded another unit, the famed Excelsior Brigade.

Colonel Luigi Palma di Cesnola, a former Italian and British soldier and veteran of the Crimean War, commanded the 4th New York Cavalry and would rise to become one of the highest ranking Italian officer in the federal army. He established a military school in New York City where many young Italians were trained and later served in the Union army. Di Cesnola received the Medal of Honor for his actions during the Battle of Aldie.

Two more famous examples were Francesco Casale and Luigi Tinelli, who were instrumental in the formation of the 39th New York Infantry Regiment. According to one evaluation of the Official Records of the Union and Confederate Armies, there were over 200 Italians who served as officers in the U.S. army.  

At least 260 Italian Americans fought as sailors in the Union Navy.

Giuseppe Garibaldi  
 
At the outbreak of the American Civil War, Giuseppe Garibaldi was a very popular figure. The 39th New York Volunteer Infantry Regiment, of whose 350 members were Italian, was nicknamed Garibaldi Guard in his honor. The unit wore red shirts and bersaglieri plumes. They carried with them both a Union Flag as well as an Italian flag with the words Dio e popolo, meaning "God and people." In 1861 Garibaldi himself volunteered his services to President Abraham Lincoln. Garibaldi was offered a Major General's commission in the U.S. Army through the letter from Secretary of State William H. Seward to H. S. Sanford, the U.S. Minister at Brussels, July 17, 1861. On September 18, 1861, Sanford sent the following reply to Seward:

According to Italian historian Petacco, "Garibaldi was ready to accept Lincoln's 1862 offer but on one condition: that the war's objective be declared as the abolition of slavery. But at that stage Lincoln was unwilling to make such a statement lest he worsen an agricultural crisis." Although the aging Garibaldi respectfully declined Lincoln's offer, Washington D.C. recruited many of Garibaldi's former officers. On August 6, 1863, after the Emancipation Proclamation had been issued, Garibaldi wrote to Lincoln: "Posterity will call you the great emancipator, a more enviable title than any crown could be, and greater than any merely mundane treasure."

In the Confederate army
Several Italian American soldiers of the Confederate States Army were veterans from the Army of the Two Sicilies who had fought against Giuseppe Garibaldi in, and were captured during, the Expedition of the Thousand during the unification of Italy. They were released after a treaty between Garibaldi and Chatham Roberdeau Wheat. In December 1860 and few months of 1861, these volunteers were transported to New Orleans with the ships Elisabetta, Olyphant, Utile, Charles & Jane, Washington and Franklin. Most Confederate Italian Americans had settled in Louisiana. The militia of Louisiana had an Italian Guards Battalion that became part of its 6th Regiment. Following the protests of many soldiers, who did not feel like Italian citizens since they fought against the unification of Italy, it was renamed 6th Regiment, European Brigade in 1862.

There also were Italian companies within regiments from Louisiana, Virginia, Tennessee and Alabama; as well as parts of a company from South Carolina.

General William B. Taliaferro, who had some Italian ancestry from the 1500s that settled in England, served in the Confederate Army.

See also
African Americans in the American Civil War 
German Americans in the American Civil War
Hispanics in the American Civil War 
Irish Americans in the American Civil War 
Native Americans in the American Civil War
Cherokee
Choctaw
Foreign enlistment in the American Civil War

References

External links 
 "Encyclopedia of the American Civil War: a political, social, and military history" - Italian-Americans by David Stephen Heidler, Jeanne T. Heidler, David J. Coles - W. W. Norton & Company, 2002, Page 1050.

Foreign relations during the American Civil War
Italian-American history
Military history of the American Civil War
New York (state) in the American Civil War
Social history of the American Civil War
Union Army